Andriy Vynokurov (born August 14, 1982) is a Ukrainian professional track cyclist.

Palmarès 

 2002
 2002 World Cup
 2nd, 1 km, Moscow
 2005
 2005–2006 World Cup
 1st, Keirin, Moscow
 2006
 2006–2007 World Cup
 1st, Keirin, Moscow
 2008
 2007–2008 World Cup
 3rd, Sprint, Copenhagen

External links 

Cyclists at the 2008 Summer Olympics
Olympic cyclists of Ukraine
Ukrainian track cyclists
Ukrainian male cyclists
1982 births
Living people
Sportspeople from Kharkiv